Anafi Municipal Airport is an airport currently under construction in the island of Anafi, Greece, in the Cyclades islands region. It is expected to be finished by the end of 2023.

See also
Transport in Greece

References

Airports in Greece